Sufyan Gulam Ismail is a British entrepreneur and philanthropist, ranked amongst the 500 most influential Muslims in the World on four occasions. A graduate of the University of Manchester, he started his career with Deloitte.  In 2001, he set up 1st Ethical, the UK's first FSA authorised, Shariah-compliant, financial services firm, which he later converted into a charity.  In 2007, he founded OneE Group, a specialist wealth management and consultancy operation.  Sufyan retired formally from full-time business activity in 2014 to tackle Islamophobia.  Sufyan's businesses have donated over £5m to alleviating poverty, community empowerment and humanitarian relief.

Education

Sufyan Studied Economics and Corporate Finance at the University of Manchester and then commenced his professional training with Deloitte. During his final exams his father died in a car accident. He also holds the Advanced financial planning qualification (AFPC).

Business

1st Ethical
In 2001, he set up 1st Ethical, the UK's first FSA authorised financial services company aimed at the Muslim community. The company specialised in regulated investments and pensions advice with a strong focus on property investment.  By 2003, the firm had become a national brand and was awarded UK's fastest growing company. In 2006, with margins falling in financial services Sufyan converted 1st Ethical into a charity for education and humanitarian relief.

OneE Group
In 2006, Sufyan founded OneE Group, a specialist wealth advisory service which aims to give clients tax breaks through R&D investment and other UK tax reliefs. The company's growth resulted in it being ranked 57th in the Sunday Times Fast Track listing in 2011 and 53rd in the Sunday Times Profit Track Listing in 2012. The company operates out of offices in Greater Manchester, London and Cyprus today employing approximately 80 staff.

'Islamic Private equity'
Sufyan is a keen proponent of non-interest based finance and has written extensively on Islamic financing models.  He also runs a Private Equity business, which invests in numerous start up businesses by young Muslims.

Philanthropy
In 2003, Sufyan set up 1st Ethical Charitable Trust with a view to alleviating poverty and supporting empowerment of underprivileged communities.  To date, the Trust and himself personally have donated over £5million to humanitarian causes.  Beneficiaries countries include Zambia, Malawi, Philippines and India.

Muslim Engagement and Development (MEND)
In 2014 Sufyan founded MEND (Muslim Engagement and Development), a specialist initiative geared towards tackling Islamophobia by advocacy work with the media and Westminster. MEND's work involved improving the media and political literacy of grass roots British Muslims. In 2016, Ismail stepped down from CEO of MEND.

In 2014, MEND's work was recognised by the world economic forum. MEND is a partner with the electoral commission and a representative body for British Muslims with IPSO.

Islamic finance Publications
Sufyan has authored several papers on elements of Islamic Finance ranging from the prohibition of interest in Islamic Law, Islamic inheritance laws and UK wills, Zakat and Insurance in Islam. In 2008, Sufyan part-authored a University Textbook on Islamic finance which was published.

Awards
Over the years, Sufyan and his firms have won numerous awards including following awards;

 NW Entrepreneur of the Year (awarded by Shell livewire)
 UK's fastest growing company
 Special Recognition award (by North West Society of Chartered Accountants)
 Lloyds TSB Professional Excellence Award
 Finalist in Ernst and Young Entrepreneur of the Year
 57th place in Sunday Times Fast Track Top 100 2011
 53rd Place in Sunday Times Profit Track Top 100 2012
 2015 – 500 Most influential Muslims in the World

Private life
Sufyan lives in Greater Manchester and is married with 3 children.

References

British businesspeople
British Muslims
Alumni of the University of Manchester
1975 births
Living people